Bottle Rocket is a 1996 American crime comedy film directed by Wes Anderson in his feature film directorial debut. The film is written by Anderson and Owen Wilson and is based on Anderson's 1994 short film of the same name. Bottle Rocket is also the acting debut for brothers Owen and Luke Wilson, who co-starred with Robert Musgrave, their older brother Andrew Wilson, Lumi Cavazos, and James Caan. Principal photography took place in various locations throughout Texas.

The film had a limited release in theaters on February 21, 1996. Though not a commercial success, the film received acclaim from critics and launched the film careers of Anderson and the Wilson brothers. Director Martin Scorsese later named Bottle Rocket one of his top-ten favorite films of the 1990s.

Plot
In Arizona, Dignan "rescues" his friend Anthony from a voluntary psychiatric unit, where he has been staying for self-described exhaustion. Dignan has an elaborate escape plan and has developed a 75-year plan that he shows to Anthony. The plan is to pull off several heists, and then meet up with a Mr. Henry, a landscaper and part-time criminal known to Dignan.

As a practice heist, the two friends break into Anthony's family's house, stealing specific items from a previously agreed upon list. Afterward, critiquing the heist, Dignan reveals that he took a pair of earrings not specified on the list. This upsets Anthony, as he had purchased the earrings for his mother as a gift and specifically left them off the list. Anthony visits his little sister at her school and asks her to return the earrings. 

Dignan recruits Bob Mapplethorpe as a getaway driver because he is the only person they know with a car. The three of them buy a gun and return to Bob's house to plan their next heist, which will be at a local bookstore. The group bickers as Dignan struggles to describe his intricate plan.

The group steals a small sum of money from the bookstore and go "on the lam", stopping to stay at a motel. Anthony meets Inez, one of the motel maids, and the two spark a romance despite their language barrier (Inez speaks little English, and Anthony barely any Spanish). 

Bob learns that his marijuana crop back home has been discovered by police, and that his older brother has been arrested. He leaves in his car the following day to help his brother, without telling Dignan. Before leaving the motel themselves, Anthony gives Dignan an envelope to give to Inez. Dignan delivers it to her while she is cleaning a room, not knowing that the envelope has most of his and Anthony's money inside. Inez does not open the envelope and hugs Dignan to say goodbye. 

As Dignan is leaving, Inez asks an English-speaking male friend of hers to chase after him and tell him that she loves Anthony. When he delivers the message he says, "Tell Anthony I love him". Dignan fails to realize he is speaking for Inez and does not deliver the message.

Dignan discovers a dilapidated but functional Alfa Romeo Spider, and he and Anthony continue with the 75-year plan. The car breaks down eventually and Anthony reveals that the envelope Dignan gave to Inez contained the rest of their cash. They have a confrontation and go their separate ways. 

Narrating a letter to his sister, Anthony says he and Bob have settled into a routine back at home that is keeping him busy. Dignan, who has joined Mr. Henry's gang, tracks Anthony down and they reconcile. Dignan invites him to a heist with Mr. Henry which he accepts on the condition that Bob is allowed in too. 

The trio meet the eccentric Mr. Henry and plan to rob a safe at a cold storage facility. He becomes a role model for them, standing up to Bob's abusive brother and tutoring Dignan on success. He invites the trio to a party at his house, and visits the group at the Mapplethorpes', which he compliments. Anthony learns of Inez's love for him and contacts her via phone. Her English has improved and they rekindle their relationship.

The group conducts their heist at the cold storage facility with Applejack and Kumar, accomplices from Mr. Henry's landscaping company. The plan quickly falls apart with Kumar unable to crack the safe, and Bob accidentally firing his gun, which in turn triggers a cardiac event in Applejack. 

As the police arrive, Dignan has locked himself out of the escape van and is arrested and brutalized by police. At the same time as the crew are doing their heist, Mr. Henry loads furniture from Bob's into a truck. Later, Anthony and Bob visit Dignan in prison and tell him about Mr. Henry robbing Bob's house. 

While Bob and Anthony are saying their goodbyes, Dignan begins rattling off an escape plan and tells his friends to get into position for a get-away. After a tense moment, the two realize Dignan is joking. Dignan says to Anthony, "Isn't it funny that you used to be in the nuthouse and now I'm in jail?" as he walks back into the prison.

Cast

 Owen Wilson as Dignan
 Luke Wilson as Anthony Adams
 Robert Musgrave as Bob Mapplethorpe
 James Caan as Abe Henry
 Lumi Cavazos as Inez
 Ned Dowd as Dr. Nichols
 Shea Fowler as Grace
 Haley Miller as Bernice
 Andrew Wilson as Jon Mapplethorpe / Future Man
 Brian Tenenbaum as H. Clay Murchison
 Stephen Dignan as Rob
 Anna Cifuentes as Carmen
 Jim Ponds as Applejack
 Kumar Pallana as Kumar

Production
In 1992, Anderson directed a 13-minute short film,  titled Bottle Rocket. The short was filmed in black and white, and also starred Owen and Luke Wilson and Musgrave. The short had a similar plot to the later feature film. The film was screened at the 1994 Sundance Film Festival, where it attracted the attention of filmmaker James L. Brooks who agreed to finance a full-length version of the short.

The feature-length film was shot entirely in Dallas, Fort Worth, and Hillsboro, Texas. The scenes at Bob Mapplethorpe's house were filmed at the John Gillin Residence, designed by Frank Lloyd Wright.

After the film failed to achieve commercial success, Owen Wilson considered joining the Marines. Bill Murray was considered for the role of Abe Henry.

Reception

Bottle Rocket received generally positive reviews from film critics. On Rotten Tomatoes, it has an 85% "Certified Fresh" rating based on 68 reviews, with an average rating of 6.83/10. The site's consensus describes the film as "Reservoir Dogs meets Breathless with a West Texas sensibility". On Metacritic, it has a 66/100 weighted average score based on 24 critics, indicating "generally favorable reviews".

Martin Scorsese is a fan of the film, calling it one of his favorite movies of the 1990s. In a 2000 interview with Esquire, Scorsese praised Wes Anderson for his ability to "convey the simple joys and interactions between people so well and with such richness."

Home media
In 2008, Bottle Rocket was released on DVD and Blu-ray as part of The Criterion Collection.

See also 

 Bottle Rocket (soundtrack)
Heist film

References

External links

 
 
 
 
 Screenplay by Wes Anderson and Owen Wilson
 Photos of Bottle Rocket Movie Locations As They Appear Today
Bottle Rocket an essay by James L. Brooks at  The Criterion Collection

1996 films
1990s buddy comedy films
1990s crime comedy films
American buddy comedy films
American crime comedy films
American heist films
Columbia Pictures films
Features based on short films
Films scored by Mark Mothersbaugh
Films directed by Wes Anderson
Films produced by James L. Brooks
Films set in Texas
Films shot in Texas
Gracie Films films
American independent films
1996 independent films
Films with screenplays by Owen Wilson
Films with screenplays by Wes Anderson
1990s Spanish-language films
1990s heist films
1996 directorial debut films
1996 comedy films
1990s English-language films
1990s American films